Hidden Power is a 1939 American drama film directed by Lewis D. Collins and starring Jack Holt, Gertrude Michael and Dickie Moore.

Cast
 Jack Holt as Dr. Garfield 
 Gertrude Michael as Virginia Garfield 
 Dickie Moore as Stevie Garfield 
 William B. Davidson as Foster 
 Henry Kolker as Weston 
 Helen Brown as Mrs. Morley 
 Marilyn Knowlden as Imogene 
 Harry Hayden as Downey 
 Regis Toomey as Mayton 
 Holmes Herbert as Dr. Morley 
 Christian Rub as Doctor

References

External links
Hidden Power at IMDb

1939 films
Columbia Pictures films
American drama films
1939 drama films
1930s English-language films
American black-and-white films
Films directed by Lewis D. Collins
1930s American films